The Shockoe Hill Burying Ground Historic District, located in the city of Richmond, Virginia, is a significant example of a municipal almshouse-public hospital-cemetery complex of the sort that arose in the period of the New Republic following disestablishment of the Anglican Church. The District illustrates changing social and racial relationships in Richmond through the New Republic, Antebellum, Civil War, Reconstruction, and Jim Crow/Lost Cause eras of the nineteenth and twentieth centuries. The Shockoe Hill Burying Ground Historic District occupies  of land bounded to the south by E. Bates Street, to the north by the northern limit of the Virginia Passenger Rail Authority (previously the CSX rail line) right-of-way (City of Richmond parcel #N0000233022) at the southern margin of the Bacon's Quarter Branch valley, to the west by 2nd Street, and to the east by the historic edge of the City property at the former location of Shockoe Creek.  The District encompasses most of a  tract acquired by the city of Richmond in 1799 to fulfill several municipal functions, along with later additions to this original tract.

The Shockoe Hill Burying Ground Historic District was listed on the Virginia Landmarks Register on March 17, 2022. The district features a suite of municipal functions and services concerned with matters of public welfare, health, and safety, which the City of Richmond relegated to its then-periphery on its northern boundary during the nineteenth century. It includes three properties which have long been recognized and celebrated, that are individually listed on the Virginia Landmarks Register and the National Register of Historic Places: the Almshouse, Shockoe Hill Cemetery, and Hebrew Cemetery. It additionally includes three newly identified sites: the City Hospital and Colored Almshouse Site,  the City Powder Magazine Site, and the Shockoe Hill African Burying Ground. The district was also the site of the city gallows. On June 16, 2022 the Shockoe Hill Burying Ground Historic District was added to the National Register of Historic Places.

The Shockoe Hill African Burying Ground is likely the largest burial ground for free people of color and the enslaved in the United States. It is conservatively estimated that over 22,000 people of African descent were buried in its . It was opened in 1816, and closed in 1879 due to overcrowded conditions. It has suffered many abuses, and was purposely made to disappear from the visible landscape. It is one of "Virginia's most endangered historic places". Current threats to the burial ground include the DC2RVA passenger rail project (high-speed rail), the east-west Commonwealth Corridor, and the proposed widening of I-64, along with various infrastructure projects.

See also
 National Register of Historic Places in Richmond

References

External links 
 Richmond Cemeteries, Shockoe Hill African Burying Ground
 Richmond Cemeteries, Shockoe Hill Cemetery
 Richmond Cemeteries, Approaching the National Register – Shockoe Hill
 U.S.News & World Report, Woman Wants to Memorialize Unmarked African Burial Ground
 Richmond Free Press, Hospital Street burial ground gets support as new historic district
 Dead Reckoning: The Historical Recovery and Unsettled Place of Richmond's Shockoe Hill African Burying Ground – The 2021 Elske v.P. Smith Lecture featuring Ryan K. Smith, Professor in the Department of History
 Richmond Times-Dispatch, "Kaine, McEachin endorse nomination of Shockoe Hill African Burying Ground to National Register of Historic Places", 3/21/2022
 The Cultural Landscape Foundation: It’s Not OK to Put High Speed Rail Lines Through the Shockoe Hill African Burying Ground
 NBC News: The growing movement to save black cemeteries
 Sapiens: At the Heart of It All
 Richmond Times Dispatch – Keep Black history visible and viable, by Michael Paul William, 02/23/2022
 Sapiens: Talk Back Episode 3
 National Trust for Historic Preservation – Preserving Sacred Ground: Shockoe Hill African Burying Ground
 Richmond Cemeteries: A moment to celebrate for Shockoe Hill
 Richmond Times-Dispatch: Shockoe Hill African Burying Ground is added to the state landmark registry, 3/18/2022
 March 18, 2022: Check out A1 Minute NOW – Shockoe Hill African Burying Ground is VA landmark
 VCU News, March 18, 2022, "Long-neglected Black cemetery in Richmond added to Virginia Landmarks Register", by Brian McNeill
 Historic Richmond: Shockoe Hill Burying Ground Historic District
 The Cultural Landscape Foundation: Shockoe Hill African Burying Ground is Now a VA Landmark
 Radio IQ WVTF – Shockoe Hill African Burying Ground in Richmond gets landmark designation
 VCU – Listing a Threatened Burial Ground on the National Register of Historic Places, April 29, 2022
 CBS Mornings – Descendant works to reclaim Virginia African American burial ground
 National Register of Historic Places Weekly List of Actiona Taken on Properties: 6/10/2022 Through 6/17/2022
 Richmond Cemeteries: The Crest of Shockoe Hill
 DHR Virginia Department of Historic Resources, 127-7231 Shockoe Hill Burying Ground Historic District
 Washington Post, October 28, 2022 "Where’s Kitty Cary? The answer unlocked Black history Richmond tried to hide." by Gregory S. Schneider
 Richmond Times-Dispatch: Richmond gets land for Burying Ground trail, by David Ress, 1/09/2023
 Willis, Samantha, Virginia Mercury " Once a dead end, a Richmond cemetery earns new respect". January 30, 2023
 Lazarus, Jeremy M., Richmond Free Press, "Rail agency begins historic cemetery review for estimated 22,000 souls", February 2, 2023
 Williams, Michael Paul, Richmond Times-Dispatch, "At any speed, we don't need a train station in Shockoe Bottom", February 22, 2023

Cemeteries in Richmond, Virginia
African-American cemeteries in Virginia
 

Cemeteries on the National Register of Historic Places in Virginia